Paul-Frédéric Rollet (1875–1941) was a Général who led in the Marching Regiment of the Foreign Legion RMLE, and was the 1st Inspector of the Foreign Legion, a post which he created under his intentions. Rollet accumulated 41 years of military service out of which 33 were in the Legion and also planned the 100th anniversary of the legion on Cameron day of 30 April 1931. Consequently, he was responsible for creating many of the Legion's current traditions.

Early life 
He was born in Auxerre, France and was admitted to the military school at Saint-Cyr in 1894. Upon graduation, he was initially assigned to the 91st Infantry Regiment but was later transferred to the 1st Foreign Regiment 1er RE in Sidi-bel-Abbes, Algeria.

Military career 
Rollet served first in Algeria from 1899 to 1902, then in Madagascar from 1902 to 1905, prior to returning to Algeria from 1905 to 1909. Promoted to captain in March 1909, he commanded the 3rd mounted combat company of the 1st marching battalion of the 2nd Foreign Regiment, 2e R.E from 1909 to 1914.

While World War I erupted, Rollet was on leave in France. Insisting to be on the front, he was assigned to the 31st Line Infantry Regiment, then to the 331 Infantry Regiment. Wounded twice, he was promoted by delegation to Chef de bataillon (Commandant – Major), based on the recommendation of général Henri Joseph Eugène Gouraud. Following several victories, he was confirmed as a Chef de battalion.

On 18 May 1917 he was assigned to the Foreign Legion and became the regimental commander of the Marching Regiment of the Foreign Legion (R.M.L.E) as a Lieutenant-colonel. Under his command, the regiment covered itself with excellence during combats of Hangard-en-Santerre, La Montagnde de Paris, then in piercing the Hindenburg Line, a combat battle which would later be designated as the anniversary of the 3rd Foreign Infantry Regiment 3e REI, heir to the traditions of the R.M.L.E. The regimental colors of the R.M.L.E were subsequently decorated with four new citations (with five previous citations already) as well as the double Fourragere, with colors of the Légion d'honneur and Croix de guerre. 
At the end of the war of 1914–1918, he participated in campaigns in Morocco with his regiment, which would be designated as the 3rd Foreign Infantry Regiment 3e REI.

Consequently, Rollet was promoted to Colonel. In 1925, he assumed command as regimental commander of the 1st Foreign Regiment 1e RE at Sidi-Bel-Abbès. He would remain until planning the 100th anniversary (the centennial) of the French Foreign Legion on Cameron day of 30 April 1931.<ref>Ces cérémonies commémoraient le centenaire de la création de la Légion étrangère, en 1831, mais furent célébrées le jour anniversaire du combat de Camerone</ref>

On 1 April 1931 Rollet assumed command tenure as the 1st Inspector of the Foreign Legion, a post which he specifically created under his intentions.

Following years of service, Rollet retired on 20 December 1935, having accumulated 41 years of military service out of which 33 years were in the Legion.

 Later life and death 

In his final years of service, he dedicated his career to the organization of the modern French Foreign Legion and the realization of considerable social profits to active legionnaires as well as those on retirement. He would later pursue social donation actions in that respect after concluding his service.

Rollet died in Paris on 16 April 1941.  He was originally buried at the French Foreign Legion's Headquarters in Sidi-bel-Abbes in Algeria.  When the Legion left Algeria in 1962 his remains were one of three chosen to be reinterred at the Legion's new headquarters in Aubagne, France.

 Legacy 
He is surnamed Père de la Légion'' (Father of the Legion), an honorary title. This title is reflected in his organization of Legion units, as well as the brotherhood he assimilated to his men.

Rollet made major contributions to promoting and preserving the Legion's history, traditions and mystique. The legion always maintained an institutional reputation of legendary and honorable values.

Recognitions and honors 
Général Rollet's awards include:

List of decorations 
Orders, decorations, and medals of France
 Grand officer de la Légion d'honneur
 Croix de guerre 1914–1918 with 7 palms and gilt star
 Croix de guerre des théâtres d'opérations extérieures with 2 palms
 Médaille commémorative du Maroc with clasps : OUDJA-MAROC-HAUT-GUIR
 Médaille coloniale with 4 clasps: SAHARA-MAROC-ALGÉRIE-MADAGASCAR
 Croix du combattant
 1914–1918 Inter-Allied Victory medal (France)
 Médaille commémorative de la guerre 1914-1918
 Chevalier de l'ordre du Mérite agricole (1911)
 Commemorative medal of the battle of Verdun (medal non-official)
 Commemorative medal of the battle of the Somme

Orde, decorations and Foreign medals
 Commandeur de l'Order of the Crown (Romania) (1917)
 Commandeur de la Spanish Red Cross 1925
 Commandeur de l'Order of Prince Danilo I (Montenegro – 1917)
 Commandeur de l'Ordre du Mérite civil d’Espagne 1930
 Commandeur de l’Order of the Oak Crown (Luxembourg – 1931)
 Grand officier de l'Ordre du Order of Ouissam Alaouite (1931)
 Grand officier du Nichan Iftikhar (1931)
 Grand officier de l'Order of Saint-Charles (Principauté de Monaco 1931)
 Grand-croix de l'Ordre royal du Cambodge 14 November 1936
 Grand officier de l'Ordre du Mérite militaire d'Espagne (Order of Spanish Military Merit) (1920)
 Officier de l'Ordre chérifien du Ouissan hafidien (1911)
 Ordre du Muniséraphon, ordre académique du Royaume du Cambodge (1936)

See also 

Major (France)
French Foreign Legion Music Band (MLE)
Moroccan Division 
1st Foreign Infantry Regiment
2nd Foreign Infantry Regiment
3rd Foreign Infantry Regiment
History of the 2nd Foreign Regiment
List of French Foreign Legion units

References 

1875 births
1941 deaths